The Michael Braude Award for Light Verse is a biennial award given for light verse in the English language, regardless of the author's nationality. It is presented by the American Academy of Arts and Letters and is accompanied by a $5,000 payment. Mrs. Lillian Braude established the award in memory of her husband, Michael Braude, in 1987.

Recipients to date 

 2012: Roger Angell
 2008: Christopher Reid
 2006: John Fuller
 2004: R. S. Gwynn
 2002: Henry Taylor
 1999: Thomas M. Disch
 1997: Robert Conquest
 1995: Wendy Cope
 1993: Turner Cassity
 1991: Gavin Ewart
 1989: X. J. Kennedy

See also
American poetry
List of poetry awards
List of literary awards
List of years in poetry
List of years in literature

External links 
 Awards at American Academy of Arts and Letters – with automated "Search Award Winners"
  and at WorldCat

American poetry awards
Awards established in 1987
Awards of the American Academy of Arts and Letters